McGaha is a surname shared by several people:
 Charles L. McGaha (1914–1984), United States Army soldier in World War II and recipient of the Medal of Honor
 Chris McGaha (born 1986), American footballer
 James E. McGaha, American astronomer, for whom the asteroid 10036 McGaha was named
 Kris McGaha (born 1966), American actress, comedian, and television program hostess
 Mel McGaha (1926–2002), American professional baseball coach
 Vernie McGaha (born 1947), American state politician
 Tracy McGaha (born 1972), American Scientist, Immunologist at the Princess Margaret Cancer Centre and University of Toronto